Prosthecium is a genus of fungi within the Melanconidaceae family.

References

External links
Prosthecium at Index Fungorum

Melanconidaceae